John 'Jack' Shorten (30 November 1887 – 9 October 1958) was an Australian rules footballer who played for Collingwood in the Victorian Football League (VFL).

Shorten was the centre half back in Collingwood's 1910 premiership team. His involvement in a second half melee kept him out of action for the entire 1911 season as he received a 28 games suspension for striking, exactly the same punishment handed out to Carlton's Percy Sheehan. It remains the longest suspension ever for a Collingwood player.

References

Holmesby, Russell and Main, Jim (2007). The Encyclopedia of AFL Footballers. 7th ed. Melbourne: Bas Publishing.

1887 births
Collingwood Football Club players
Collingwood Football Club Premiership players
1958 deaths
Australian rules footballers from Melbourne
One-time VFL/AFL Premiership players
People from Williamstown, Victoria
Australian military personnel of World War I
Military personnel from Melbourne